Noble Senior Secondary School is an intermediate school located near the town of Dildarnagar in Ghazipur, Uttar Pradesh, India, it is situated at Dildarnagar to Dewaitha village road.

References

High schools and secondary schools in Uttar Pradesh
Education in Ghazipur district
Dildarnagar
Educational institutions established in 1998
1998 establishments in Uttar Pradesh